Jagatjit Cotton & Textile Football Club (formerly known as JCT Mills FC; abbreviated as both JCT FC, or simply JCT) was an Indian professional football club based in Phagwara, Punjab. Founded in 1971, the club was sponsored by Jagatjit Cotton and Textile Mills under the leadership of Samir Thapar and participated in the National Football League which was later renamed I-League. They also participated in Punjab State Super Football League under licence from Punjab Football Association. The club was disbanded in 2011.

Nicknamed "the millmen", JCT have won many tournaments and brought laurels to the State of Punjab. They won the inaugural edition of the National Football League in 1996. They were one of the benchmark teams in North Punjab along with Border Security Force SC and FC Punjab Police, winning prestigious state level tournaments. It was the first team from India to sign a foreign coach and the first team outside of Calcutta to win the IFA Shield, second oldest football tournament in India.

In 2011, JCT emerged as sixth ranked Indian team, and 957 universally, in the international rankings of clubs during the first ten years of the 21st century (2001–2010), issued by the International Federation of Football History & Statistics.

History
Jagatjit Cotton, Sahil Bagga and Textile Mills constituted the football club in March 1971. However, the club got recognition from 1974 onwards when several players joined the club from the Leaders Club of Jalandhar. Included among these players was Inder Singh, who captained the India national team in previous years, won the Arjuna Award in 1969, and managed the club until 2001. The Leader Club, started by Lala Dwarka Das Sehgal had played a major role in popularizing football in Northern India in the 1960s and 1970s. After the end of Leaders Club era, JCT Mills have since taken the mantle and become the biggest and most successful football club in this part of India. In 1983, British coach Bob Bootland took charge of JCT and guided the team winning the Durand Cup same year.

JCT Limited had been involved in the Punjab Football Association (PFA) for the three decades. On 1 July 1992, the club appointed former Indian international Sukhwinder Singh, who previously played for the club, as chief coach; He served as deputy general manager and joint secretary as well. In 1995, they clinched Scissors Cup title, defeating Malaysia Premier League side Perlis F.A. by 1–0. In 1996, they emerged champions in the Federation Cup, defeating East Bengal 5–3 through penalties. JCT won the inaugural NFL title in the 1996–97 season. In that season, they clinched the prestigious IFA Shield title, defeating Iraqi Premier League side Al-Karkh SC by 1–0. In January 2007, the JCT management decided to change the club name from JCT Mills FC to JCT FC.

In 2007, JCT announced an association with the English club Wolverhampton Wanderers, as part of the Wolverhampton-India Project launched at the House of Commons of the United Kingdom. In the inaugural season of I-League, JCT achieved third place, with 33 points.

In 2011, two members from the Wolves Academy members visited the club with an intention "to start special training programmes". However, a few months later, in June, the club announced of its disbanding. In a statement, the club said, "Today football teams worldwide have become self-sustaining enterprises for which high exposure is needed to build viewership and spectators in the stadium. JCT won the inaugural national league in 1996, where there was high quality TV exposure and widespread public interest. But since then the league has had negligible exposure and the teams have been going almost unnoticed." It added, "JCT Limited, being a corporate, needs to justify to its stakeholders the effort vs visibility of the football team."

In 2014, reports said that the club was planning on a return to professional football through I-League 2nd Division the following season. However, it failed to materialize.

Stadium

JCT Mills Football Club used Guru Nanak Stadium of Ludhiana for their National Football League and Punjab State Super Football League matches. The stadium has a capacity of approximately 30,000 spectators.

JCT Mills has also used Guru Gobind Singh Stadium in Jalandhar for some seasonal home matches of the National Football League and Punjab State Football League.

Rivalries
JCT shared rivalry with local side FC Punjab Police, which emerged as one of the strongest sides in Punjab State Super Football League. They have also enjoyed rivalries with two other local sides: Leaders Club (Jalandhar), and Border Security Force.

Notable former players
For all former notable JCT Mills FC players with a Wikipedia article, see: JCT Mills FC players.

Performance in AFC competitions

 Asian Club Championship: 1 appearance
1996–97: Second Round

Achievements
In last 3 decades of its existence, the JCT FC is the first Indian team outside Kolkata to win the prestigious IFA Shield. Apart from this, the JCT Club won many prestigious tournaments. They also won the opening edition of the National Football League in 1996. JCT has also participated in the Asian Club Championship during its 1996–97 season and reached the second round. They also achieved third place in 2007–08 season of the newly formed I-League.

The club was an eight-time winner of the Punjab State Football League and five-time winner of the Durand Cup. The success and the constant good performance of the club is attributed to its owner, the Thapars who apart from being business moguls, have been in constant effort to enhance the bar of their club at all the levels.

Affiliated clubs
The following club was affiliated with JCT FC:
 Wolverhampton Wanderers FC (2007–2011)

Honours

League (Domestic)
National Football League
Champions (1): 1996–97
Runners-up (1): 2006–07
I-League
Third place (1): 2007–08
 National Football League III
Runners-up (1): 2006–07

League (Regional)
Punjab State Super Football League:
Champions (9): 1987, 1990–91, 1991, 1995, 2002, 2003, 2004–05, 2005–06, 2006–07
Runners-up (4): 1985–86, 1988, 1992–93, 1999

Cup

Federation Cup
Winners (2): 1995, 1996
Durand Cup
Winners (5): 1976, 1983, 1987, 1992, 1996
Runners-up (7): 1974, 1975, 1977, 1981, 1985, 2006, 2010
IFA Shield
Winners (1): 1996
Rovers Cup
Winners (1): 1997
Runners-up (3): 1979–80, 1984, 1992
Indian Super Cup
Runners-up (1): 1997

Other honours
Gurdarshan Memorial Cup
Winners (10): 1982, 1983, 1985, 1988, 1989, 1990, 1992, 1995, 2001, 2002
Runners-up (2): 1991, 2003
Sait Nagjee Football Tournament
Winners (4): 1976, 1979, 1985, 1995
Madura Coats Trophy
Winners (1): 1978
Scissors Cup
Winners (1): 1995
Shaheed-e-Azam Sardar Bhagat Singh Memorial Trophy 
Winners (1): 2002
Runners-up (1): 1998
Principal Harbhajan Singh Memorial Football Trophy
Winners (2): 2005, 2009
DCM Trophy
Runners-up (3): 1977, 1987, 1993
Mohan Kumar Mangalam Football Tournament
Runners-up (2): 2005, 2006
Aurungabad Mayor's Trophy
Runners-up (1): 2006

Partnership
 India On Track

In 2015, JCT FC entered into the partnership with India On Track to re-launch the club in the 2015–16 season of the I-League 2nd division. The aim of the partnership is to provide elite residential training and uplifting the development of its academy at Hoshiarpur, Punjab.

Academy
JCT FC launched their Under-19 team in 1998 and participated in the first National Football League (under-19) in October 2001. In the next edition between May and June 2003, they reached the finals. JCT Football Academy won the 2011 I-League U19. In 2011 their senior team was disbanded, but the academy continued to operate. The academy team later participated in the 2012 Durand Cup.

Academy honours
 I-League U19 
 Champions (1): 2011

See also

 List of football clubs in India
 Defunct football clubs in India

Notes

References

Further reading

External links
 
 JCT ropes in a spanish coach for revival
 JCT – Pride of Punjab
 Football Clubs – JCT FC
 Indian Football – JCT FC
 Season ending Transfers 2006 (NFL India)
 NFL 2006/2007 League Table
 JCT Mills

Association football clubs established in 1971
Kapurthala
Association football clubs disestablished in 2011
Defunct football clubs in India
I-League clubs
 
1971 establishments in Punjab, India
2011 disestablishments in India
Football clubs in Punjab, India
Works association football clubs in India